Kinesin light chain 1 is a protein that in humans is encoded by the KLC1 gene.

Conventional kinesin is a tetrameric molecule composed of two heavy chains and two light chains, and transports various cargos along microtubules toward their plus ends. The heavy chains provide the motor activity, while the light chains bind to various cargos. This gene encodes a member of the kinesin light chain family. It associates with kinesin heavy chain through an N-terminal domain, and six tetratricopeptide repeat (TPR) motifs are thought to be involved in binding of cargos such as vesicles, mitochondria, and the Golgi complex. Thus, kinesin light chains function as adapter molecules and not motors per se. Although previously named "kinesin 2", this gene is not a member of the kinesin-2 / kinesin heavy chain subfamily of kinesin motor proteins. Extensive alternative splicing produces isoforms with different C-termini that are proposed to bind to different cargos; however, the full-length nature of some of these variants has not been determined.

Interactions
KLC1 has been shown to interact with MAPK8IP3, KIF5B and KIF5A.

References

Further reading